Nepterotaea is a genus of moths in the family Geometridae.

Species
Nepterotaea diagonalis
Nepterotaea furva

References

Geometridae